The Bharbhunja are a Muslim community found in the states of Gujarat and Uttar Pradesh in India. In Uttar Pradesh, the community are also known as Bharbhunja Shaikh.

Origin 

The two Bharbhunja groupings are, in fact, distinct with each having their own origin myth, traditions, and language. The uniting factor for both of these communities is their traditional occupation—grain parching. It gets its name from the Sanskrit word bhrij, which means to fry.

In Gujarat 

The word Bharbhunja is derived from the Gujarati words bhad which means an earthen oven, and bhunja which means to parch. Historically the Bharbhunja made a living by selling parched grain. The community originates from the Udaipur and Jodhpur regions of Rajasthan. They speak Gujarati, but most understand Hindi.  The Bharbhunja are found mainly in the cities of Ahmadabad and Surat.

The Bharbhunja consist of a number of clans, the main ones being the Behlim, Chauhan, Pawar, Bhati and Dhangar. All these clans are of equal status, and intermarry. They are a strictly endogamous community, and prefer marrying close kin.

The traditional occupation of the Bharbhunja is the selling of fried and parched grains. Like other artisan groups, they have seen a decline in their traditional occupation, with many petty businessmen or wage labourers. Like other Gujarati Muslims groups, they have a caste association, the Jamat Gilkhan Afroz, which deals with issues of community welfare. The Bharbhunjas are Sunni Muslims, and have customs similar to other Gujarati Muslims communities.

In Uttar Pradesh 
The Bharbhunja in Uttar Pradesh are traditionally grain parchers.  They  have a mixed origin, with some claiming to be of Shaikh origin, while other claiming Rajput origin. In fact, the community consists of forty clans, each of whom has its own origin myth. Often the divisions is merely territorial, such as the Hamirpuriya, originally from Hamirpur, the Jaunpuriya, originally those from Jaunpur. Each subdivision in referred to as a biradari. They are found mainly in the districts of Saharanpur, Muzaffarnagar, Meerut, Aligarh, Ghaziabad, Bijnor, Moradabad and Badaun. The Bharbhunja speak both Urdu and Khari boli. A second cluster of Bharbhunjas are found in the districts of Barabanki and Bahraich, who speak the Awadhi dialect.

The Bharbhunja are still involved with grain parching, although many are now petty businessmen. They are strictly endogamous, and marriages tend to occur within the biradari. They live in multi caste and multi religious settlements, but occupy their own distinct quarters. Each settlement has a caste council, known as a panchayat, which acts as an instrument of social control. It deals with intra community disputes, as well as punishing those who breach communal norms. Although they live in close proximity to other Muslim groups, such as the Shaikh,  Kabaria, Ansari, Muslim Dhobi and Qassab in Awadh, and the Muslim Teli, Muslim Banjara, Baghban and Rohilla in Rohilkhand, there is very little interaction, and virtually no intermarriage. The community are Sunni Muslims, and have customs similar to other Uttar Pradesh Muslims.

See also 

 Bharbhunja Hindu

References

Social groups of Gujarat
Tribes of Kutch
Muslim communities of Gujarat
Muslim communities of India
Social groups of Uttar Pradesh
Muslim communities of Uttar Pradesh